The Association of Professional, Executive, Clerical and Computer Staff (APEX) was a British trade union which represented clerical and administrative employees.

History
The Clerks Union was formed in 1890 and later was renamed as the National Union of Clerks. Then, following rapid growth and amalgamation with several other unions, the name was again changed to the National Union of Clerks and Administrative Workers (NUCAW) with a membership of around 40,000.

In 1940, NUCAW merged with the Association of Women Clerks and Secretaries (AWCS) to form the Clerical and Administrative Workers' Union (CAWU). The union organised in the white-collar sector in the City of London and across the country, and had particular success in recruiting in the engineering industry. In the 1960s its membership grew rapidly, but it was less successful in the 1970s, membership increasing by 18%, while that of its rival, the Association of Scientific, Technical and Managerial Staffs (ASTMS), nearly doubled.

The union changed its name to the Association of Professional, Executive, Clerical and Computer Staff (APEX) in 1972. It was the union at the centre of the Grunwick dispute in the 1970s.

APEX, like its predecessors, was an affiliated trade union of the British Labour Party and was a key influence on the right-wing of the Party, particularly as, until 1972, it enforced a rule preventing communists from holding positions in the union.  Its relations with other unions were often difficult, as it competed not only with the ASTMS for members, but also with the National Union of Bank Employees and various general unions.  In particular, a dispute over members at General Accident was referred to the Trades Union Congress Disputes Committee and the fall-out led to APEX's general secretary, Roy Grantham, failing to win re-election to the General Council of the TUC.

In 1989 APEX merged with the GMB trade union and now exists as a section within the GMB.

Election results
The union sponsored numerous Labour Party candidates, many of whom were elected:

Leadership

General Secretaries
1890: W. Moritz
1890: W. M. Sutherland
Charles Dyer
1906: Herbert Henry Elvin
1941: Fred Woods
1956: Anne Godwin
1963: Henry Chapman
1971: Roy Grantham

Presidents
1890: Wallas
1890: J. W. E. Hale

1912: G. E. O'Dell
1914: R. J. W. Scott
1915: John Lindsley
1916: Charles Latham
1918: James McKinlay
1927: Hubert Hughes
1940: William Elger
1946: Bob Scouller
1951: Helene Walker
1961: David Currie
1972: Denis Howell
1983: Ken Smith

See also

UK labour law
List of UK trade unions

References

External links
GMB webpage on its history and that of its precursor unions
Catalogue of the APEX archives, held at the Modern Records Centre, University of Warwick

 
Defunct trade unions of the United Kingdom
1940 establishments in the United Kingdom
Clerical trade unions
GMB (trade union) amalgamations
Trade unions established in 1940
Trade unions disestablished in 1989
Trade unions based in London